Jason Hudson may refer to:

Jason Hudson, murdered in 2008, see Murder of Jason Hudson
Jason Hudson, a character in Call of Duty: Black Ops
Jason Hudson (rugby league) (born 1973), Australian rugby league footballer